Leopoldów  is a village in the administrative district of Gmina Trzeszczany, within Hrubieszów County, Lublin Voivodeship, in eastern Poland.

The village has a population of 500.

References

Villages in Hrubieszów County